William James Doran (June 14, 1898 - March 9, 1978) was a Major League Baseball third baseman who played for the Cleveland Indians. An alumnus of Saint Mary's College of California, he played three games for the Indians during the 1922 Cleveland Indians season.

External links

1898 births
1978 deaths
Cleveland Indians players
Major League Baseball third basemen
Saint Mary's Gaels baseball players